Penicillium cecidicola is a fungus species of the genus of Penicillium which produces pentacecilide A, pentacecilide B, pentacecilide C.

See also
List of Penicillium species

References

Further reading

 Penicillium cecidicola, a new species on cynipid insect galls on Quercuspacifica in the western United States

cecidicola
Fungi described in 2004